Great Glacier Provincial Park is a provincial park located in the Stikine Country region of British Columbia, Canada. It was established on January 25, 2001 to protect Great Glacier and the surrounding mountainous terrain.

History
According to the legends of the Tahltan and Tlingit First Nations, Great Glacier once spanned the entire width of the Stikine River to meet the toe of Choquette Glacier on the eastern side of the valley. The glacier was also the site of the last major battle between the Tahltan and Tlingit First Nations many generations ago.

Geography
Great Glacier Park is located in the Boundary Ranges of British Columbia between the lower Stikine River and the Alaska-British Columbia boundary. Immediately across the river from Great Glacier Park is Choquette Hot Springs Provincial Park, which protects a collection of hot springs and associated wetlands.

See also
Stikine, British Columbia

References

Stikine Country
Glaciers of British Columbia
Provincial parks of British Columbia
Boundary Ranges
Stikine River
2001 establishments in British Columbia
Protected areas established in 2001